Nathaniel Grey (X-Man) is a fictional superhero appearing in American comic books published by Marvel Comics, commonly in association with the X-Men. Created by writer Jeph Loeb and artist Steve Skroce, the character first appeared in X-Man #1 (March 1995).

X-Man is an alternate version of the regular Marvel Universe hero Cable, hailing from the alternate timeline Earth-295, first established in the "Age of Apocalypse" storyline. He is the biological son of his dimension's Scott Summers and Jean Grey, born of genetic tampering by Mr. Sinister. His first name is derived from his creator's (Mr Sinister's) real name, Nathaniel Essex, and his last name from his genetic mother Jean Grey. Due to not being infected by a techno-organic virus as Cable was, Nate achieved vast telepathic and telekinetic powers (reflecting those that Cable would have had without the virus), and was one of the most powerful mutants in existence during his lifetime.

X-Man was originally a mini-series replacing Cable during 1995's "Age of Apocalypse" alternate reality storyline. However, after that storyline ended, Marvel transported Nate Grey to Earth 616, the primary shared universe in which most Marvel Comics are set. The series ran until 2001, during which Nate struggled with being the most powerful person in a strange world. The series ended with his seemingly sacrificial death.

Despite his name, X-Man was only briefly a member of the X-Men, both in the Age of Apocalypse reality and on Earth 616. Initially, the character was referred to only by his real name, both in "Age of Apocalypse" and on Earth 616. Shortly before the "Onslaught" storyline, Nate began to be sporadically referred to as X-Man, without explanation for the in-universe origin of the code name.

Publication history

Nate Grey first appeared in an eponymous four-issue miniseries in 1995 written by Jeph Loeb and drawn by Steve Skroce. Afterward, the character starred in a self-titled ongoing series. When sales began to wane in 2000, the series was revamped by Warren Ellis as part of the Revolution event beginning with issue 64. The new direction was unsuccessful, and X-Man was canceled at issue 75 in 2001.

The character returned during the 2008 - 09 "Dark Reign" storyline, appearing in the miniseries Dark X-Men. He was also featured in New Mutants (vol. 3) #25-50.

Fictional character biography

Age of Apocalypse 

In the parallel reality known as The Age of Apocalypse, Mister Sinister, one of the elite Horsemen of the High Lord Apocalypse, artificially created Nate (naming him Nathaniel Grey), from genetic material from Cyclops and Phoenix. Sinister created Nate as the ultimate mutant and hoped to use him in his own bid for power against Apocalypse.

However, Cyclops, in his many subversive raids on Sinister's pens, helped Nate escape Sinister's hideout; neither Cyclops nor Nate knew their connection to each other. Nate came under the tutelage of Forge and several other mutant outcasts. Forge began the long process of teaching Nate how to control his powers as well as the benefits of being a "good guy". Nate also began to see the horrors of Apocalypse's world firsthand, and was determined to bring him down.

Sinister infiltrated Forge's group disguised as the wanderer Essex in order to follow Nate's progress. Sinister eventually killed both Brute and Forge. Nate battled Sinister to avenge Forge's death. During the conflict, Sinister allowed Nate to read his mind, revealing both Nate's origin and his ultimate destiny of defeating Apocalypse. Sinister emerged from the fight mortally wounded, and Nate left to battle Apocalypse. That battle occurred while the alternate X-Men were beginning their final gambit—defeating this reality with the M'Kraan Crystal.

Holocaust interrupted Nate's battle with Apocalypse as the X-Men's plan succeeded and the Age of Apocalypse was washed away. In response, an angry Nate impaled Holocaust with a shard of the M'Kraan Crystal, with unexpected results — both vanished.

A New World

The consequences of that act were unexpected and far-reaching, as Nate and Holocaust were both transported to the actual reality when it reasserted itself. Nate arrives in Switzerland, and is approached by a very alive but amnesic Madelyne Pryor. Madelyne helps Nate adjust to this reality, but they are separated soon after by Selene. Nate wanders the Earth alone, encountering many who either desire to use his power or genuinely want to help him, only for Nate's own suspicious nature to prompt him to drive them away. During this time, he unintentionally contributes to the eventual manifestation of Onslaught: Nate senses Xavier's astral form spying on him, and drags him into the real world. This feat inspires the aspects of Onslaught in Xavier's mind to create a psychic body for himself, resulting in Onslaught manifesting an independent body.

Eventually, Nate meets Threnody, one of Sinister's underlings seeking freedom. After rescuing her from the Marauders, the pair form a mutually beneficial partnership: Nate provides protection, while Threnody acts as his guide to the world. They are briefly separated during the events set into motion by Onslaught, but soon reunite and take refuge in New York following his defeat. Their relationship deepens despite Nate's lingering doubts on her connection to Sinister, but Threnody eventually leaves, unwilling to answer questions about her past.
 
Believing Threnody to be dead, Nate takes up a firm if tentative friendship with Spider-Man. Nate is then attacked by Morbius the Living Vampire, who is drawn to Threnody via the strong attachment to her in Nate's blood. Due to her own death-fueled mutant ability, Threnody is drawn to Morbius as well, but Nate and Spider-Man intervene. Nate challenges Threnody to return to him once she has given up on stealing life from others and leaves her. He soon finds Madelyne collapsed in Switzerland. The reunion is interrupted by Jean Grey, who is alerted to Madelyne's return by Madame Sanctity. Nate is doubly shocked, first when Madelyne immediately begins trying to kill their visitor, and again when he sees that the two women are virtually twins. Madelyne assumes Nate will side with Jean and attacks them both.

Nate instinctively aids Jean, and together they are able to pierce Madelyne's mind, in the process revealing that Nate is responsible for her revival. In his confusion, after crash-landed in Switzerland, Nate unconsciously resurrects Madelyne Pryor in his subconscious attempt to reach out to his "mother". Nate sorrowfully attempts to undo his mistake, but Madelyne refuses to die again. She returns the power Nate used to animate her and escapes. Nate turns down Jean's offer to contact the X-Men, but then discovers that his telekinesis is gone. Nate visits Moira MacTaggert for answers, which she provides: Nate's telekinetics are still there, but his own body is suppressing them. Havok appears as Nate is leaving, and invites him to join the Brotherhood of Mutants.

Nate helps the Brotherhood liberate Aurora, a former member of Alpha Flight, from Department H. Havok helps Nate regain his telekinesis to the point where he can fly again via a meditation chamber. Nate later discovers the operation to free Aurora had a second purpose: to obtain canisters of Coldsnap-9, a deadly gas. Worse, Nate learns that Dark Beast is a member of the Brotherhood. Nate tries to separate Aurora from the Brotherhood, but quickly learns that due to her personality shifts, she needs treatment that Dark Beast can best provide. However, Nate refuses to leave the gas in the Brotherhood's hands, and opens all of the canisters, exposing himself to the gas.

Nate survives due to the timely return of his telekinetics at their peak, but collapses from exhaustion in New York, where he is found and cared for by three mysterious girls named Jam (Jasmine Archer), Marita, and Bux. Soon after, Nate is telepathically alerted by Cable that he is the only one close enough to protect the children of Jean's sister, Sara Grey, from the Prime Sentinels of Operation: Zero Tolerance. Nate rescues the kids despite his weakened state, leaving Joey and Gailyn in the care of their grandparents.

Nate's time in New York is marked by near-endless conflict and his powers spiraling out of control. He is attacked by the psychotic killer Jackknife, a remnant of the Abomination's followers. Nate himself unknowingly unlocked Jackknife's latent potential in the past, and though Jackknife proves immune to Nate's abilities, Nate manages to defeat him, earning the favor of many citizens who witness the battle. The next day, Jam loses an arm in a motorcycle crash, but is mysteriously healed by a doctor who has had contact with Nate. The miracle boosts Nate's popularity even more, and he is admired by hundreds of followers. Nate thwarts a terrorist attack, but when lives are still lost, his admirers turn on him. Nate learns that the one responsible for Jam's accident, as well as his curiously fast rise to and fall from fame, is the Purple Man, who has been controlling Nate and the citizens with his pheromones.

The Purple Man hopes to turn Nate into a modern messiah and use his power to alter reality. The plan backfires: Nate resists being controlled, and upon learning that Jam's healed arm was only a solid psionic projection, he loses faith in himself. In desperation, Nate tries to erase all memories of himself from the minds of New Yorkers. Spider-Man intervenes, pleading with Nate not to do it. The two come to blows, but are attacked by the Psi-Ops, a mysterious team of armored psi-talents seeking to capture Nate. Nate and Spider-Man defeat them, saving a bridge full of people in the process, but are still blamed for the entire mess. Nate is still plagued by self-doubt when Madelyne Pryor returns to him.

Once they relocate to Canada, the new Madelyne seems intent on forcing Nate to admit he needs her. Nate resists, and is troubled by a nightmarish vision of his end: battling a masked madman in a pyramid, a stranger watches from the shadows as Nate and half of the world are consumed by an explosion of his power. This causes him to unleash a huge burst of power in the real world, which awakens three of the Great Beasts: Tundra, Kolomaq, and Somon. Nate destroys Tundra, and launches Kolomaq and Somon into space to keep them from destroying a nearby town. Madelyne refuses to play the part of the hero and help Nate fight, but returns to teleport him back to Switzerland.

While recovering in Madelyne's care, Nate realizes that Threnody's mutant power might not only allow her to escape death, but also to drain his power, keeping it at controllable levels. He seeks her on the psi-plane, but Madelyne jealously interferes. Nate's effort is interrupted when the psi-plane shatters around him, robbing he and Madelyne both of their telepathy.

Nate and Madelyne protect the town of Clifden from several disasters, which are eventually linked to tech-gnomes. During this they meet and are constantly shadowed by Ness, a member of the secret human/demon hybrid race, the Hellbent, who also had a vision that Nate would soon be responsible for the destruction of the planet. They travel to Dublin, where a series of murders have left victims burned down to their bones. Nate detects an AOA energy signature on the corpses, and discovers that Nemesis is responsible. With Madelyne's help, Nemesis's armor implodes, leaving him to escape in his human form.

Nate then learns that Blaquesmith has been sending him the visions as a warning, and the tech-gnomes as a test, in order to prepare Nate for a future that he must avoid at all costs (the very same that Ness seeks to prevent). He transports Nate and Madelyne to Latveria for a confrontation with the resurrected Stryfe, Cable's evil clone and thus yet another sibling/counterpart of Nate, during the "Blood Brothers" crossover. Stryfe uses Doom's power siphon to drain Nate's enormous power into himself, but with assistance from Cable and Madelyne, he is defeated. It is revealed that it was Stryfe (the masked madman from Nate's vision) and not Nate, who would be responsible for the end of the world.

Nate was also continually hunted by Operation: Gauntlet, a special task force of the United Nations, who had been especially ordered to target and destroy him specifically, as the potential single greatest threat to all life on Earth.  During their final confrontation in Ireland, Ness was killed and Madelyne was presumed to have died as well.  However, she had merely been drained of her life energy during the intense battle to the point that she was now physically extremely aged, and secretly chose to abandon Nate rather than let him see her in such a condition.

Nate went on to have additional rematches with fellow AoA refugees Dark Beast (who again teamed up with Gene Nation against Nate, who teamed up briefly with Generation X), Sugar Man and Holocaust (now calling himself Nemesis).

Nate visited his "parents," Scott and Jean, who were at the time recuperating in Alaska. The strength of the newly forged bonds between Nate and his "parents" was shown when, soon after, as the X-Men had been disbanded, Nate (alongside Archangel, Wolverine and Cable) was one of the few people Jean and Scott called for help, as they needed to defend the new race "the Mannites" from the mysterious "Death".  After meeting with the Fantastic Four, Nate would then be captured by a re-villainous Caliban, upon orders of Apocalypse who planned to use Nate as the new host-body for his soul, during the "Twelve Saga".  However, Cyclops ultimately sacrificed himself instead, in place of his "son", an act that would eventually have many significant repercussions much later in time for the rest of the X-Men.

Nate was also reunited with Threnody, who revealed the circumstances of their separation (mainly, that Madelyne had killed her), which had been unknown to Nate until then. However, during their time apart, Threnody had fully evolved into a mutant death-goddess, constantly pursued by "zomboids", and with no desire to reform despite Nate's devotion to saving her. They separated for good, and though Threnody is revealed to have given birth to a monstrous baby, the father's identity remains unknown.

Shaman to the Mutant Tribe
Madelyne Pryor eventually returned some time later, but she was manipulating Nate in his sleep and making him destroy things. She finally revealed that she was a Madelyne from another dimension, who had killed the original Madelyne shortly after her last meeting with Nate in Ireland.  This alternate-Madelyne  needed Nate to do something for her and showed him how to shift between parallel earths or alternate realities, and she had Nate take them to the alternate reality that she was from. She wanted to use Nate's vast power to help her rule her Earth. Nate rejected her, and was located by that alternative reality's version of himself, who was a broken version of Nate Grey (meaning he could never reach his full potential in power) and was slightly insane from his experiences; he also considered himself a shaman to the people of that Earth. Nate read the mind of his alternate self to learn the intricacies of alternate realities.

Nate also learned how Madelyne would take each Nate Grey from these alternate realities hoping to find "fully functional" ones to use as weapons to rule. He also showed Nate how to talk with a dead man so that they could get information from him about Madelyne; the dead man was that reality's Forge, who was at one time Madelyne's lover. Forge revealed that Madelyne was really a Jean Grey from yet another parallel Earth who posed as Madelyne and ruled that world. That reality's real Madelyne had died, but it was said she would return again. Forge also told them how this alternate Jean Grey had used him to make her a machine so she could travel from parallel world to parallel world. At this point, they were attacked by Madelyne's personal bodyguard, Mr. Scratch and in the process, merged parts of themselves to throw him off. Mr. Scratch's mutant power was that no other mutant power had any effect on him, so the Nates had to literally change characteristics to fool him.

After the merger, only one Nate remained, so Mr. Scratch crippled him and brought him back to Madelyne, who quickly realized that Mr. Scratch had the wrong Nate. The broken version of Nate told Madelyne he sent Nate somewhere she would never find him. She killed the broken Nate and began to power her parallel world device to find Nate again, but Nate returned and put an end to her world conquering days. As a result of the merger of the two Nates, a black x-shaped tattoo appeared on Nate's chest to act as a genetic brand - passed on to him from the alternate version of himself - that prevented his powers from killing him as they had threatened to do from the start.

After the defeat of this evil "Queen Jean", Nate set out to make a difference in the world and considered himself a Mutant Shaman, a teaching he embraced from the alternate version of himself. Nate became immensely powerful, and had few qualms about using his power to mete out justice to his fellow mutants. He then dealt with and stopped the madman Qabiri from destroying all alternate earths on the Spiral of Earths. Qabiri was a being from an alternate Earth far upspiral, he wanted to destroy every earth below his on the Spiral of Earths because he feared that someone from these lower earths would one day invade his earth and bring it to ruin. Qabiri succeeded in destroying several alternate earths before Nate was able to stop him.

Finally, he confronted the Anti-Man, an alien sent to Earth to inseminate his genetic code into all living cells on the planet so that his people could harvest the resulting energy. To save the world from destruction, Nate merged himself with the Anti-Man, in essence "poisoning" the cells of Earth with his presence, and dissipating both of them across the globe.

Dark Beast commented that the peculiar circumstances of X-Man's demise would theoretically allow him to be restored to life.

Return
Nate resurfaces once more, in a small town, where his presence causes several of the inhabitants to dreamwalk and continuously repeat "I'm an X-Man." Norman Osborn sends his team of X-Men, consisting of Mimic, Weapon Omega, Dark Beast and Mystique, to investigate and to raise public opinion.

As Norman's X-Men investigate, both Mimic and Omega are overwhelmed with Nate's energies and go on a rampage leaving Mystique and Dark Beast alone with a patient that they were examining. Shortly Nate once more takes physical form, much to Beast's shock and horror, believing Mystique to be his mother Jean Grey, since she had taken her form.

Nate angrily attacks Beast but does not realize that Jean is actually Mystique who manages to distract him long enough in order to save Dark Beast's life. Following that incident Osborn tasks his X-Men to hunt down and possibly capture Nate for experimentation and to feed Weapon Omega. In order to do that the Osborn's X-Men go to H.A.M.M.E.R.'s PSI-division, which has taken a cult like appearance. The PSI-Division manages to contact Nate only for him to absorb most of their psychic energies and to learn what has happened to the world and to the mutant race in his absence. Angrily he demands to know what they, presumably Osborn's X-Men, had done.

Nate finally manages to materialize and confronts Norman's X-Men. He dispatches the Sentry by telling him of their mutual past, something that he claims to be the truth, which upsets Sentry so that he retreats in order to consider this. The other members of Norman's team do not fare better either. Only Ares poses a threat. Since Ares is the personification of War, Nate is unable to perceive any future or probability that does not include Ares fighting him. Mimic, still rattled by the vision he saw, attempts to learn more. He drags Nate into another plane of existence. After a short conversation they are once more confronted by Ares, who has followed them and is overjoyed to have an opponent such as Nate. Ares finally manages to overpower Nate and while Norman attempts to confirm Nate's death, a flash of light knocks them all back leaving the room empty and Nate's body missing.

Unbeknown to the Dark X-Men, Nate has taken possession of Norman's body, something that only Mystique notices. After trying and failing to persuade Nate to remove the tech in her body which is rigged to explode should she betray Norman, she recruits the rest of the Dark X-Men to invade Norman's mind and to confront X-Man. While Nate and Norman are engaged in a battle of wills Norman gloats that he and Nate are evenly matched. Yet Nate reveals that this was his plan all along, and that while he and Norman are deadlocked his X-Men are free to roam the deepest recesses of Norman's mind. They do and by doing so they unlock Norman's Green Goblin personality which gloatingly states is about to kill them all.

After a brief battle between the Green Goblin and the Dark X-Men within Osborn's mind, Nate is defeated when Green Goblin forces Mimic to replicate Omega's powers, turning the pair into a powerful siphon that drains Nate's energies. Now returned to the physical world, a powerless Nate is tortured in front of the Dark X-Men as an example to them. Norman asks him if he has any last words before he's "used as coal" in Dark Beast's Omega Machine, but a gloating Norman cuts off Nate before he has a chance to finish speaking. Nate is taken away to the machine, though his eventual fate is not shown.

Rescue Mission
Learning that Nate Grey had returned to the living, Cyclops reorganizes the New Mutants roster under Danielle Moonstar's leadership and tells them to find Nate and bring him home. Nate is found in an abandoned H.A.M.M.E.R. facility in a sadistic scheme of the Sugar Man. Sugar Man has Nate hooked up into the Omega Machine, a device built by Norman Osborn to open portals to other realities, hoping that he will open a portal to Sugar Man's home reality. Realizing that the only way Sugar Man will leave him alone is to give him what he wants, Nate uses all of his strength and willpower to open a portal to his home reality, but before Sugar Man can escape into it, he is defeated by the New Mutants and was going to be taken into custody by Captain Steve Rogers.

Nate is taken to Utopia, where it is revealed that he burnt out most of his powers while opening Sugar Man's portal, and the only remaining power he has is telekinesis. Cyclops then welcomes Nate to Utopia, hoping he will make it his new home.

Fear Itself
Spending most of his time in Utopia's danger room, Nate tested his new limits and quickly realized just how diminished his telekinesis was. Seeing Nate as a younger version of her father, Cable, Hope Summers took a keen interest in Nate and watched as his frustration grew. She stepped in and offered to teach Nate what Cable taught her: how to get by without powers. Nate gladly accepted and the two began to train regularly together.
Perhaps feeling indebted to them for their rescue, Nate joined Moonstar's team without being asked. Although feeling insecure with his lessened powers, he began to use his telekinesis more effectively after taking Sunspot's advice to visualize a symbol. After an accidental side trip to Hell the team journeys to the Nordic Hel to aid the goddess Hela against the Serpent's undead soldiers. Nate's memories of the Age of Apocalypse play a pivotal role in victory and he continues to learn how to cope with his diminished powers.

Schism
After an explosive argument over the way the younger generation of mutants were being treated, Wolverine decided to part ways from Cyclops and reopen the school in Westchester. Agreeing with the idea that the X-Men shouldn't be concerned with shielding kids from the harsh realities of life and wanting to get to know Cyclops better, Nate wanted to stay on his side. At the same time, Nate was used to being independent and decided to join Dani's team when they moved into a house in San Francisco where they would continue to report to Cyclops but attempt to live normal lives, as well as helping the team search for Clarice Fergison. They join her on her mission to discover why a rock band is causing natural disasters. Following their adventure Blink decides to journey to the Jean Grey School to learn more about her powers.

Re-Animator
After suffering a series of nightmares, Doug Ramsey convinced the team to visit Paradise Island, the place where he once died. Tensions flared when Nate began to question Doug's mental stability which led to Dani insulting Nate's low-level telekinesis. While Nate admitted that he could still only pick up with telekinesis what he could lift physically, he later demonstrated his new method of telekinetic attack when the team came under attack from the island's Ani-Mates. By focusing his telekinesis into the shape of an X, Nate was able to target his power more precisely. The trip proved to be worthwhile when they discovered a plot by the Ani-Mator to return to life in virus form. Infected by the virus and fused together, a feverish Nate and Dani began to acknowledge their attraction to each other.

The Ani-Mator was defeated but the horrific mission took a toll on the team. Noticing the somber mood, X-Men ally Blink took the team for a night out in Madripoor. While the rest of the team partied, Nate drifted off by himself, unsure how to act in such a jovial atmosphere. Dani reached out to comfort him and the two finally expressed their feelings for each other with an intimate kiss.

Exiled
Nate's mutant abilities began to steadily improve. He mastered his X-shaped telekinetic technique and even managed to use his telepathy in small doses. The New Mutants and the gods of Asgard soon come into conflict when the "First Hero" Sigurd returns and is pursued by the vampiric Disir.  When Sigurd's spell turns the Asgardians into mortals and erases their memories it is up to the New Mutants team and Kid Loki to save the day. Danielle Moonstar journeys to Hel to retrieve Bor, the Father of Odin to free the Disir from his curse. Finally the truth behind the Disir is revealed and Hela acquires bold new allies.

His knowledge and familiarity of alternate universes became handy when the New Mutants found themselves in one created by a future megalomaniac version of Doug Ramsey. When the X-Men and Avengers went to war over how to handle the Phoenix Force, Nate fought bravely on the front lines; first to protect Hope Summers and then to defend Cyclops' utopian rule. When Cyclops became corrupt due to the Phoenix Force, his leadership came to a disastrous end and Dani's team went their separate ways. When Moonstar joined the superhero team, the Defenders, Nate remained close to her and the pair finally confirmed their relationship status when they awkwardly ran into Dani's former flame, Cannonball.

Nate Grey's whereabouts are presently obscure, but Matthew Rosenberg has confirmed that he is backpacking through Europe on a soul-searching journey in response to a fan's comments on Twitter. He later went on to admit that his earlier statement was a joke and has since said that Nate is a mystery, he "vanishes, maybe he'll come back at some point?"

Horsemen of Salvation
Nate Grey has since made his presence known in the Prime Earth apparently with all his powers intact and a change of heart since he had kidnapped Magneto, Warren Worthington, Blob and Omega Red in order to turn them into his Horsemen of Salvation, an inversion of the Horsemen of Apocalypse, and also abducted Kitty Pryde, anti-mutant senator Ashton Allen and Apocalypse himself and sent the Horsemen to remove the X-Men from their way and used his telepathy to reach every mind on Earth to share his vision of the world and to reshape it to his image. He may had also used the Horsemen to hunt down Dark Beast and Sugar Man, or more likely hunted them down himself and while Dark Beast was able to survive, Sugar Man wasn't that lucky. Nate later reveals that his powers are killing him, even though he possesses the black x-shaped tattoo, and for that reason he decided to change the world for better. During the last stand, Nate takes Jean Grey to his own mind and finally reveals to her that he's dying because he found and used the Life Seed on himself which not only made him recover his powers but also increased them to the point of overriding the black x-shaped tattoo which was protecting him and in the process twisted his mind. Though Jean tries to reason with him, Nate nevertheless uses all his powers to finally reshape the world in his image, a world where the X-Men no longer exists.

Age of X-Man

By using the Life Seed he possessed, Nate Grey created hope out of thin air and secretly took the X-Men to this new plane of existence where everyone is a mutant and no longer persecuted for being different. He also implanted fake memories on them so they couldn't remember their old lives in the Marvel Prime Universe. However, fissures in the air teased that everything isn't as it seems with certain individuals beginning to remember their old lives once the floodgates opened. Nate just couldn't stop those memories from appearing, no matter how hard he tried. Eventually some confront X-Man over his deception, while others try to protect him from their attack as he attempts to explain his thought process. At one point a fissure opens, revealing a scene from the Prime Universe with Cyclops, Havok, Mirage and Mystique squaring off against Office of National Emergency soldiers. Later, other X-Men begin to revert to their pre-Age of X-Man appearances. Surprisingly, while a majority of the X-Men are furious with Nate for his deception, there are a few who wish to remain in this false reality.

Bishop tries to be the voice of reason among his teammates by urging them to leave the world behind. However, X-Man offers up a solution by handing over the Life Seed that helped him create the utopia. Once the X-Men have passed back through the breach, Magneto would plunge the Life Seed in Nate's chest, destroying the Age of X-Man once and for all.

But instead of using the Life Seed, Magneto and Nate sit down to discuss how they both can help one another. Because Nate allowed Magneto to live in a world that was the exact opposite of what he was born into, Magneto hands the Life Seed back to Nate to allow the Age of X-Man to live on. Once Magneto exits, his Age of X-Man counterpart reappears, which possibly means he left a part of himself behind.

Powers and abilities
Originally designed so his powers would eventually kill him, Nate was an Omega-level mutant who had the ability to tap into the enormous psychic resources of the astral plane in order to manipulate matter and energy at vast scales until his powers were burnt out by the Omega Machine. The Omega Machine, designed by Dark Beast, greatly diminished Nate's once incredible psychic powers including telepathy, precognition, and telekinesis.

He could use his telepathy to read and control multiple minds at once and even read residual thought imprints left on objects touched by people (psychometry), communicate with others by broadcasting his thoughts, create illusions by altering the perceptions of others, fire psionic blasts that could scramble an opponent's thought processes (causing the victim either intense pain, or rendering them unconscious), project his mind into the astral plane and even pull the astral projections of other telepaths into the physical world, and sense dimensional rifts or anomalies. He once even used the photoelectric transmission of a Shi'ar hologram to psionically connect his mind with that of Lilandra over an unknown interstellar distance.

His telekinesis was so powerful that he could move massive objects with his mind, fire blasts of psychokinetic energy that could shatter steel, create mental barriers that could stop most attacks, levitate his body, and fly at supersonic speeds. He was powerful enough to single handedly defeat Tundra of the Great Beasts and was even able to psionically isolate the planet's gravitational pull on the two other Great Beasts, Tolomaq and Somon. He also crushed the whole city of San Francisco de Quito, Ecuador while asleep in Buenos Aires, Argentina; the cities are over 2600 miles apart.

His control over his telekinesis was so acute that he was able to create holograms by mentally manipulating water, molecules and dust to refract light, bend security lasers to avoid detection, and even move the atoms of a wall around his form so that he passed through the wall like a ghost. He was also able to use his telekinesis to bend the Earth's magnetic field and create electromagnetic pulses. His telekinesis extended to at least a molecular level, and he could imbue himself with super human physical attributes by focusing his telekinesis inwards.

After his brief return from his dimensional travels that equipped him with a special genetic dampener that would eventually prevent his powers from killing him, Nate displayed further abilities, which included the power to view and traverse higher planes of existence, to reconstitute his body from astral energy in a similar manner as Onslaught and to transform his physical body back into astral energy. Though not a real teleporter, he then could traverse alternate realities by breaking the barriers between universes and once 'teleported' multiple people all over an alternate version of New York into another dimension. Since he was able to connect any point in one dimension with any point in the dimension he was in at the moment, he could theoretically also use this to cross vast interstellar distances by traveling back and forth.

An alternate version of Jean Grey, "Queen Jean" described Nate Grey as the ultimate telekinetic with the statement: "It is what all Nate Greys have been on every earth".

Upon examination by Moira MacTaggert, she suggested his psionic powers rivaled that of a Phoenix Force-imbued Jean Grey. In another instance, he was measured as having a psionic energy output matching that of the Dark Phoenix. He was even described by Norman Osborn as powerful enough to go toe-to-toe with the Sentry.

However, Nate lost most of his powers after using nearly all of his strength and willpower to open a portal to Sugar Man's home reality, a process that gave him acute nerve damage, which effectively burnt out his power set. Although at first the only ability he had was some residual telekinesis, which has had been defined by himself as an extension of his physical strength and therefore limited to masses equivalent to what he can lift or manipulate physically. He has also shown the power to produce small but powerful telekinetic blasts and demonstrated some residual telepathy that enabled him to deliberately scan and perceive his immediate vicinity for sentient beings; along with assist his teammate Cypher in entering his own mind. He is also able to levitate himself over short-distances.

Recently, Nate was able to use a Life Seed to restore his powers. However, this process overruled his X-shaped genetic tattoo. Because of this Nate was slowly being killed once again by the level of his powers. He can capture and humiliate Apocalypse; turn off Kitty Pryde's powers; control Omega-level mutants like Magneto and Storm, turning them into his Horsemen of Salvation; telepathically communicate with everyone on Earth; wipe out all places of worship on Earth with a thought; overpower Legion in Legion's own mind and take over his body; and create a new reality where everyone is a mutant, and then transport people to that reality against their will. Legion claims that Nate is so powerful that he belongs to a level above Omega.

Reception
 In 2014, Entertainment Weekly ranked X-Man/Nate Grey 99th in their "Let's rank every X-Man ever" list.
 In 2018, CBR.com ranked X-Man 19th in their "Age Of Apocalypse: The 30 Strongest Characters In Marvel's Coolest Alternate World" list.

Relationship to Cable
Although Nate Grey (X-Man) is the Age of Apocalypse counterpart of Nathan Christopher Summers (Cable), their parentage is not identical. Both are descended from the genetic material of Scott Summers and Jean Grey, but the circumstances of Cable's and Nate's birth/creation are entirely different: Nate was grown in a laboratory in an alternate dimension by Mr. Sinister from the genes of Scott and Jean, and Cable was born to Scott and Madelyne Pryor (a clone of Jean Grey also created by Mr. Sinister). As a result, Cable has taken to referring to Nate as his half-brother.

Due to their genetic similarities, and lending support to the notion of their being counterparts, Nate and Cable have identical psychic profiles, resulting in a painful feedback to both parties when they are in close proximity to each other, in a way never demonstrated when either was in close proximity to Stryfe, Cable's clone - though this is shown to vary with the strength of their respective telepathic abilities. For instance, when Cable's telepathy was burnt out, they did not face that problem. Both are physically quite similar, with the same glowing left eye and blanched hair (though to different degrees due to age). Moreover, when Cable was de-aged in Cable and Deadpool, he greatly resembled Nate Grey, while a What If? set in a possible future showed that Nate would grow up to look identical to Cable, though that is not uncommon for siblings, which - genetically speaking - they are.

However, Nate and Cable are distinct in a number of ways. First, Nate, having done no time traveling, is much younger than Cable. Second, Nate is much more powerful than Cable, as Cable's techno-virus infection means that he must continuously use most of his power to keep the virus at bay, while Nate has full access to his mutant abilities - though at least at first, Cable had a far greater degree of skill in using those powers. Finally, Cable possesses extensive military and weapons skills as a result of being raised in a war torn future ruled by Apocalypse, while Nate primarily relies on his considerable mutant powers.

The juxtaposition of the two characters allowed writers to address issues of identity and nature versus nurture and explore the complex nature of family relationships in the X-Men's world.

Collected editions

Other versions
During his time on Earth 998, ruled by the evil Queen Jean, X-Man not only met one of his counterparts, but he also learned that there had been many Nate Greys in the multiverse. Obviously, he was not as unique as he thought. Apparently, the one thing all Nates had in common was that they had been born/created on a different Earth than the one they later ended up living on. Each Nate Grey being the ultimate telekinetic weapon, Queen Jean hunted them down and lured them to her reality, to make good use of them. She had her scientists come up with a special genetic brand that would prevent the Nates from burning out their powers. However, most of the Nate Greys were dysfunctional and, when the Queen was unsatisfied with their performance, she killed them and moved on to the next. It is unknown how many Nate Greys fell prey to Queen Jean before she was stopped.

Shaman
Nate Grey came to the Earth-998 from his native reality, Earth-2098, which was sacrificed to restore Earth-998. The Red Queen wanted to use him as an ultimate weapon, but he was dangerously unstable, so she gave him a genetic insignia, to stabilize his powers. In the process of experimentation, his mind was damaged and he went mad. The Queen seemingly slew him, but he actually survived and escaped.

Becoming a Shaman, he built a hidden village where his "tribe", the people who fought with the Queen, could live. At some point, his tribe had stolen and preserved the body of Forge, Queen's best maker.

Eight years later, when Nate Grey from Earth-295 came to Earth-998, Shaman helped him escape from the Red Queen. He told X-Man that the Queen tried to use his powers, but failed, and began traveling to different realities, in search of the perfect weapon, a "working Nate Grey". But in all realities she found only a "defective" Nate, until she met X-Man. Together both Nate's went to a hidden village where, under the guidance of the Shaman, X-Man used his powers to talk with Forge, who told them the truth about the Queen. Immediately thereafter, the village was attacked by Mr. Scratch and the Black Knights. Scratch destroyed Forge's body, paralyzed X-Man, and almost strangled Shaman while the Knights killed all the villagers. Shaman used his powers to stabilize X-Man's power, gave him his X-Gene insignia and sent him home to Earth-616. Thinking it was Nate Grey from Earth-295, Scratch captured Shaman and took him to the Red Queen who, realizing the ruse, killed him.

Nate Xavier
On Earth-253 Nate Xavier was one of the three strongest people on the planet. Nate was a member of the team of heroes known as the People's Protectorate. When Qabiri arrived on Earth-253 the team tried to stop him, but they all failed, Nate was killed by Qabiri, and the entire reality was destroyed.

Earth-9806
Nate Grey used his precognitive powers and saw a future, where he fought with Stryfe to death, and when he died his powers destroyed the half Earth.

Earth-9997
In the universe designated as Earth-9997 (Earth X), Nate Grey was eventually infected by the Techno-Organic Virus, and became Stryfe. He battled Cable, and died trying to protect Madelyne Pryor.

What If?
In the alternate Age of Apocalypse depicted in What If? X-Men Age of Apocalypse, both Xavier and Magneto were killed when Legion travelled back in time. Nate wasn't created in a lab but was the natural son of Scott Summers and Jean Grey and grew up in a peaceful haven that mutants created for themselves in the Savage Land. Apocalypse rose to power and attacked this mutant community, declaring them traitors. Nate was the sole survivor and joined a band of heroes led by Captain America to end Apocalypse's rule. This version of Nate was vengeful and ruthless and when the time came, he deemed that simply killing Apocalypse wasn't enough. Betraying his teammates, Nate acquired the power to travel back in time and stop Legion's initial attack himself. When Captain America attempted to stop him, disaster struck and in addition to Xavier, Magneto, and Legion, thousands of innocent civilians died, resulting in countless new alternate timelines that Apocalypse would also rule.

In other media

Film

 In X-Men: Days of Future Past, a mutant scavenger resembling Nathaniel Grey / X-Man is seen digging through the rubble of the X-Mansion before he is killed by the Sentinels. At the end of the film, he appears in the new timeline of 2023 at the X-mansion.

Video games
 X-Man is a hidden character in the PSP version of X-Men Legends II: Rise of Apocalypse, voiced by Quinton Flynn.

Trading card games
 X-Man appears as a character in both the VS System and OverPower trading card games.

References

External links
 X-Man at Marvel.com
 UncannyXmen.net Spotlight on X-Man
 

Characters created by Jeph Loeb
Comics characters introduced in 1995
Fictional characters from parallel universes
Fictional characters with precognition
Fictional characters with energy-manipulation abilities
Fictional characters with dimensional travel abilities
Fictional characters who can turn intangible
Fictional characters with electric or magnetic abilities
Fictional characters with elemental transmutation abilities
Fictional genetically engineered characters
Fictional shamans
Marvel Comics American superheroes
Marvel Comics characters who have mental powers
Marvel Comics characters who can teleport
Marvel Comics male superheroes
Marvel Comics mutants
Marvel Comics telepaths
Marvel Comics telekinetics
X-Men supporting characters
X-Men titles
New Mutants